Wilton Zaiser is an American gasser drag racer.

In 1956, at the NHRA national meet in Kansas City, Missouri, Zaiser won A/Gas.

Zaiser took a second gasser class win at Detroit Dragway  in Detroit, Michigan, in B/GS in 1960, with an Oldsmobile-powered 1941 Willys.

Notes

Sources
Davis, Larry. Gasser Wars, North Branch, MN:  Cartech, 2003, pp. 180 and 181.

Dragster drivers
American racing drivers